Hot Dogma is the second studio album by the Australian alternative rock band TISM. It was released on 1 October 1990 and peaked at number 86 on the ARIA Charts. The title comes from a joining of the two phrases hot dog, a food, and dogma, a specific religious belief. An additional disc, Hot Dogma - The Interview Disc was added to initial sales copies and contains live responses by TISM to an unheard DJ’s questions.

Reception
In a review of TISM’s sixth studio album The White Albun, Anton S Trees of FasterLouder compared it to Hot Dogma, where the latter is "filled with moments of introspection and reflection on the nature of self, existence and mortality – TISM examine the value of life. Most prominent amongst the examinations of mortality and the cyclical nature of existence is 'Life Kills'." 

Steve Bell of theMusic.com.au website noticed it "quickly became a fan favourite but didn't set the world on fire commercially nor bother the charts, so TISM were soon unceremoniously dumped by Phonogram during 1991 and found themselves homeless."

Cover and liner notes
The cover of the album features what appear to be Chinese Red Guards carrying a large banner with “TISM” written across it and carrying what, on first look, appears to be Mao Zedong's Little Red Book, but is on closer inspection The TISM Guide To Little Aesthetics. The artwork closely resembled posters of the time of Mao's reign.

The Chinese on the cover translates into "The unification of the proletariat under the banner of TISM".

The back cover of the album has the track lists in Chinese, however the Asian division of Polygram released a version with the track titles in English. The titles are listed in English in the liner notes.

Track listings

LP version

CD and cassette versions

The unlisted segue and "Life Kills" are indexed as one 5:52-long track on the iTunes and Spotify releases.

Hot Dogma - The Interview Disc
LP copies of Hot Dogma were bundled with a pack-in 7" single, containing a humorous open-ended interview with TISM and blank spaces for a DJ to insert the questions. Both sides contain the same interview.

Questions 
 "Your new album is on PolyGram, will you change now that you're signed to a major label?" 
 "How did you guys come to be in a band?"  
 "Why don't you ever show your face?" 
 "Your live shows have a reputation for being pretty wild affairs. Do you deliberately set out to work up your audience?"  
 "What kind of people come to your shows?" 
 "Your new album Hot Dogma is pretty amazing - over an hour of music, all kinds of different styles; what can you tell us about it?" 
 "OK, so you obviously prefer not to give much away in interviews. Why is that?" 
 "I am a self-respecting DJ..." 
 "I do think I have a feel for what's going down..."  
 "I do have a certain duty towards my audience..."
 "YES!"

The last four tracks on the disc are questions from TISM to the DJ.

Charts

Release history

References

1990 albums
TISM albums